"The Plot Against the Giant" is a poem from Wallace Stevens's first book of poetry, Harmonium. It was first published in 1917, so it is in the public domain.

Stevens was called "the Giant" in his Harvard days, and he confessed in an interview a year before his death that "[i]n my younger days I liked girls. But let's not stress that. I have a wife." The mumbling giant, perhaps a lumberjack sharpening his axe, may be compared to the bucks whose course is changed by the firecat poet in "Earthy Anecdote", here replaced by three girls. The poet challenges and changes the ordinary. The yokel may be checked, abashed, and undone. Maybe he is changed.

The poem's theme of beguiling female and bumbling male can be compared to "Last Looks at the Lilacs" and "Two Figures in Dense Violet Night".

Buttel detects a hint of the work of the Pointillists in the "cloths besprinkled with colors / As small as fish eggs."

Notes

References 
 Buttel, R. Wallace Stevens: The Making of Harmonium. 1967: Princeton University Press.

1917 poems
American poems
Poetry by Wallace Stevens